Nikkie de Jager-Drossaers (born 2 March 1994), better known by her YouTube channel name NikkieTutorials, is a Dutch makeup artist and beauty vlogger. She gained online popularity in 2015 after her YouTube video "The Power of Makeup" became popular and inspired many other videos of people showing their faces with and without makeup.  her YouTube channel has 14 million subscribers and over 1.5 billion video views.

Career 
De Jager first began uploading videos to YouTube in 2008, at the age of 14, after watching MTV's The Hills while sick and being inspired by Lauren Conrad's makeup. She then began searching YouTube for tutorials to recreate the look, and was inspired to begin creating her own. After uploading videos for about two years, she enrolled in makeup coursework at B Academy in Amsterdam. She then signed to Colourfool Agency in 2011, and began working as a professional makeup artist.

In the autumn of 2013, she became the head makeup artist for the RTL 5 show I Can Make You a Supermodel with Paul Fisher. De Jager left Colourfool Agency at the beginning of 2014 to work as a freelance hair and makeup artist.

Forbes magazine named De Jager one of the top ten beauty "influencers" in 2017. In 2017, she also won the award for "YouTube Guru" at the Shorty Awards and the award for "Choice Fashion/Beauty Web Star" at the Teen Choice Awards.

In 2017, De Jager uploaded a video reviewing a foundation produced by a Prague-based cosmetics brand and spoke about the company using her image, specifically a screenshot from her "The Power of Makeup" video, to sell their products on social media without her permission. She expressed disappointment in the company's actions, feeling they had lied to their followers as she was not wearing any of their products in the photo of her they had used to promote their company.

In January 2019, it was announced that De Jager would serve as the Global Beauty Adviser for Marc Jacobs Beauty. The brand stated in a press release that "in this newly created role, Nikkie will be integrated into the brand’s product development process, as well as share her incredible talent and expertise to expand unique content and artistry around the world on both Marc Jacobs Beauty and her own channels."

On 12 June 2020, it was announced that De Jager would become a goodwill ambassador at the United Nations.

On 23 September 2021, De Jager launched her cosmetic brand, Nimya, after having developed it for three years. The brand featured three products upon launch: Moisturizer/Primer Hybrid, Setting Spray, and Cooling Ice Stick & Glow Serum, as well as a minifan to go with the products.

Collaborations 
De Jager has collaborated with beauty brands like OFRA Cosmetics and Maybelline. Her line with OFRA Cosmetics in 2017 included liquid lipsticks and a highlighter palette. In December 2019, she collaborated with Lady Gaga, promoting her makeup brand Haus Laboratories.

In August 2020, De Jager launched her own eyeshadow palette in collaboration with the brand Beauty Bay.

Personal life 
On 13 January 2020, De Jager uploaded a video to her YouTube channel, titled "I'm Coming Out", in which she came out as transgender and that she had been blackmailed by a still unnamed person who threatened to make her transgender status public. She underwent her transition as a teenager.

De Jager got engaged to her fiancé, Dylan Drossaers, in August 2019. The two got married on 6 September 2022. 

On 8 August 2020, De Jager and Drossaers were robbed at gunpoint in their house in Uden. The Dutch police reported one other resident suffering superficial injuries. The police launched an investigation shortly after, and later stated that arrests were made during the investigation.

Television 

In September 2017, De Jager was a participant in the Dutch game show The Big Escape. In January 2019, she participated in the nineteenth season of the popular Dutch reality game show Wie is de Mol?. She was eliminated from the competition in the third episode. In 2019, De Jager also appeared as a guest judge on BBC Three's version of Glow Up. In September 2020, she returned to Wie is de Mol? for a special 20th anniversary season. She went on to become the winner of this season.

After her coming-out video became popular in January 2020, De Jager was a guest on The Ellen DeGeneres Show, where she talked about her experience coming out as transgender. She later spoke out about her experience on the show while being interviewed on De Wereld Draait Door, stating that she was treated differently from other guests, and that the show's host, Ellen DeGeneres, was "cold and distant".

On 10 February 2020, it was announced that De Jager would be the online host of the Eurovision Song Contest 2020, which was planned to be held in Rotterdam. The event was later cancelled due to the COVID-19 pandemic; De Jager subsequently appeared in the replacement show Eurovision: Europe Shine a Light, broadcast on 16 May 2020, where she reported the show's online content live to the public. She was the first transgender person to host the contest.

In September 2020, De Jager was announced as a guest judge on the Drag Race Holland, the Dutch version of RuPaul's Drag Race.

Awards and nominations

References

External links 
 
 

Living people
People from Wageningen
Dutch YouTubers
Beauty and makeup YouTubers
Dutch make-up artists
YouTube channels launched in 2008
1994 births
Transgender women
LGBT media personalities
LGBT YouTubers
Dutch LGBT artists
Reality television participants
Dutch television personalities
Women television personalities
Contestants on Dutch game shows
YouTube vloggers
People from Uden